is a Japanese anime television series that tells the story of the everyday life of four princesses from the Netherworld who are oblivious to the happenings in everyday life in the human world. The name of the anime is often known as Magical Pokaan and shortened to Magipoka.

Story
The story depicts the misadventures of four princesses from the Netherworld: Uma the Witch, Pachira the Vampire, Liru the Werewolf, and Aiko the Android along with Keimie (the princess' invisible chaperone). These princesses are adapting to life in the human world and reside in their Garakuta House (a makeshift treehouse complex with the name being a homage to the author of the same name) in Hikarigaoka (a fictional Japanese city that's not to be confused with Hikarigaoka Station). The girls are faced with small self-centered problems such as finding a boyfriend, blending into society, learning about Earth's cultures, and staying one step ahead of Super Doctor K-Ko.

Characters
 
 
 It is revealed that Uma is a witch, although she is not yet adept at spell casting due to her being a "third rate alchemist". She has a happy personality and finds joy in exploring the human world. When she makes a discovery about the world, she quickly and proudly points it out to the other girls only to be generally the last to discover such things, becoming disappointed when others learn faster than she does. When she is not trying to master spells, Uma reads romance manga. Sometimes when Uma is casting a spell, her skirt lifts up revealing her panties. Her overall design is reminiscent of a rabbit-girl ranging from her hair style that occasionally moves, her pet rabbitlike creatures, and the carrot cushion that she sleeps with.

 
 
 Pachira is seen during the course of the anime as a vampire with pointy ears and two small black bats riding on her hair ribbons. While she displays the common weakness of vampires such as a weakness to garlic and holy water, her biggest weakness (at least in her mind) is her small breast size which she hopes to have expanded whatever way possible. She has the ability to fly by sprouting wings, extends her fingernails into claws, and is seen eating regular food as well as having a vampire's traditional lust for drinking blood (although she mainly drinks tomato juice). She turns to ash in sunlight, but it is not fatal as noted in the prologue of episode one as she just ends up in a burnt state. Pachira wears a long coat and cardboard box over her head whenever she goes out. When she goes to the beach, Pachira wears a heavy coat of sunscreen on her skin to prevent her from getting burned. Though Pachira wouldn't show up on any camera due to her not casting a reflection, she can be seen on a thermographic camera.

 
 
 It is explained to the audience that Liru is a werewolf with her wolflike ears and tail exposed in her normal form. She appears as a tan blonde-haired teenager dressed in a brown leather harness that goes across her breasts, brown fingerless gloves with gold-spiked bracelets on them, blue denim shorts, and white thigh length boots. Liru has an energetic personality and has animal traits such as the ability to leap great distances with little effort, and has enhanced strength, speed, stamina, and senses. Like all werewolves, she is lycanthropic and her wolf form looks similar to a yellow puppy. A minor recurring theme in the episodes is when Liru sees a full moon-shaped object, she immediately changes into her wolf form (though strangely enough she seems somewhat resilient to the real moon's effects). Liru is also shown to have a weakness to silver. Being a werewolf, Liru enjoys eating any type of meat and her favorite type of meat is Matsuzaka Beef.

 
 
 Aiko is an android with silver hands and silver boot-shaped feet, an outdated CPU, and low memory size. It is a common girl's name, but the "Ai" in her name is written with the kanji for "Iron" rather than "Love". Aiko performs housekeeping duties for the other girls like cooking, shopping, and laundry because of her devoted mind making her the housekeeper of the group. Being an android, Aiko does not eat or drink which came in handy one time when two snow people served cold food that temporarily froze the other three princesses. She always hopes to get her own human-type body through whatever way possible. When at the beach, Aiko uses a wind-up submarine-type suit to go swimming after getting herself waterproofed.

 
 
 An invisible woman who serves as the chaperone of the four princesses. Though she does not appear very often except in a narrative part in episode one and narrative parts at the end of some episodes or is heard saying something to the princesses in some episodes, her most notable scene involved an English speaking game where she served a bad-tasting nattō drink to the princess who messes up by speaking Japanese with her also drinking nattō when Aiko messed up. In "The Spell of Ifs Is Dr. ○×△□," she was dressed as a nurse with bandages to cover her invisible body when the episode shows each princess as a doctor.

  and 
 Jun 
 Tan 
 Uma's pet rabbitlike creatures. Jun is a peach-colored rabbitlike creature and Tan is a black rabbitlike creature. They can spin their ears around like a helicopter propeller to fly, use the end of their ears as hands, and occasionally float around. Tan can also change into Uma's hat when Uma is occasionally seen in her black cape.

 
 
 A semi-regular character who serves as the primary antagonist of the series. She is a busty scientist and an expert on the Netherworld who is constantly trying to get the "scientific community" to see how bad the four princesses are ... for her own status gain. Super Doctor K-Ko wants proof of the supernatural to gain admittance into the scientific elite and what better than if one or all of the princesses are either captured in her traps or exposed on TV ... if her plans did not have a tendency to go awry.

 
 
 Hongo is Super Doctor K-Ko's midget assistant. He assists Super Doctor K-Ko in her quest to expose the princesses as Netherworld monsters.

Episodes
Each of the episodes were split into two segments.

The following episodes were exclusive to the DVDs.

Staff
 Original Story: Garakuta House
 Director: Kenichi Yatagai
 Composition, Script: Yasunori Ide
 Character Design, General Production Director: Katsuzō Hirata
 Prop Design: Yoshihiro Watanabe
 Art Design: Naomi Igata (KUSANAGI)
 Art Director: Ayū Kawamoto (KUSANAGI)
 Color Design: Yukiharu Obata
 Photography Directors: Junichi Watanabe, Tsugio Ozawa
 Editor: Masahiro Matsumura
 Sound Effects Director: Hiroyuki Matsuoka
 Sound Effects Production: Half HP Studio
 Music: Noriyasu Agematsu
 Music Production: Lantis
 Production: Genco
 Animation Production: REMIC
 Production Assistance: Studio Gash
 Produced by Magipoka-dan

Theme songs
Opening theme , sung by Yōsei Teikoku (band, meaning 'Fairy Empire')
Ending theme , lyrics by Yasunori Ide, composed by Hiroki, sung by various voice actresses from the show:
{| class="wikitable"
! Episode !! Song title !! Sung by !! Character
|-
| 1 || Shichaimashō sensuous   || Momoko Saitō    || Uma
|-
| 2 || Shichaimashō predator   || Hitomi Nabatame || Liru
|-
| 3 || Shichaimashō suggestive || Aya Hirano      || Pachira
|-
| 4 || Shichaimashō devoted    || Satomi Akesaka  || Aiko
|-
| 5 || Shichaimashō sensuous   || Nomico      ||
|-
| 6 || Shichaimashō suggestive || Nomico          ||
|-
| 7 || Shichaimashō predator   || Nomico          ||
|-
| 8 || Shichaimashō devoted    || Nomico          ||
|-
| 9
| colspan="3" align="center" | Same as episode 3 ED
|-
| 10
| colspan="3" align="center" | Same as episode 2 ED
|-
| 11
| colspan="3" align="center" | Same as episode 4 ED
|-
| 12
| colspan="3" align="center" | None
|-
| OVA || Shichaimashō invisible || Nomico || Keimie
|}

CDs
Lantis has released three CD albums:
 LACA-5529, ¥2500, June 21, 2006
 LACA-5517, ¥1800, May 24, 2006
 LACM-4257, ¥1200, April 26, 2006 (maxi-single)

References

External links
 
 

Dengeki Comics
Dengeki Daioh
Lantis (company)
2006 manga
Television series about shapeshifting
Werewolves in animated film
Anime with original screenplays
Shōnen manga
2006 endings
2006 anime television series debuts
2006 anime OVAs